Secret Story (occasionally referred to as Secret Story: La casa de los secretos) is the Spanish version of the reality show Secret Story, based on the original French version. The show inherits more or less the fundamental principles of Big Brother, a reality show created by producer John de Mol in 1997. The housemates are cut off from the outside world for ten to fifteen weeks in a house called "house of secrets", where every room is fitted with cameras. They have to keep a secret while trying to discover the other housemates' one.

Season 1 (2021) 
The first series premiered on 9 September 2021 and finished on 23 December 2021, running for 106 days. For the first time in the format's history, all housemates are celebrities. Throughout the game, all housemates have to keep a secret while trying to discover the other housemates' one.

Housemates and secrets 
{| class=wikitable style="margin:auto; text-align:center; width=100%; font-size:95%;"
|-
! width=1%|
! width=15%|Contestants
! width=25%|Occupation/Known for being…
! width=40%|Secret
|-
| bgcolor="FEE101" |1
| Luca Onestini
| Reality TV star
| "I became famous the day I was born" (discovered by Isabel)
|-
| bgcolor="A7A7AD" |2
| Cristina Porta || Sports journalist || "I wanted to be a nun & I've been offered to be escort" (disc. by Lucía)
|-
| bgcolor="A77044" |3
| Gemeliers || Singers || "We will inherit a marquisate" (disc. by Luca)
|-
| bgcolor="violet" |4
| Luis Rollán || TV panelist & actor || "I am a TV host's lover" (undiscovered)
|-
| bgcolor="dc143c" |5
| Sandra Pica || LIDLT 2 temptress || "During my childhood, I was called suet ball with legs" (disc. by Gemeliers)
|-
| bgcolor="dc143c" |6
| Julen de la Guerra || MYHYV star || "I have a physical anomaly I call warrior dolphin" (disc. by Gemeliers)
|-
| bgcolor="dc143c" |7
| Miguel Frigenti || TV panelist || "I was given the last rites" (undisc.)
|-
| bgcolor="dc143c" |8
| Adara Molinero || GH VIP 7 winner || "I made love in a mortuary" (undiscovered)
|-
| bgcolor="dc143c" |9
| Isabel Rábago || Former PP Media Commun. manager || "I was a kelly" (disc. by Julen)
|-
| bgcolor="dc143c" |10
| Cynthia Martínez || Miss Barcelona 2007, Canales' ex-lover || "I had a relationship with a Real Madrid player" (undisc.)
|-
| bgcolor="dc143c" |11
| Canales Rivera || Bullfighter || "I lost my virginity to a trans person" (undisc.)
|-
| bgcolor="dc143c" |12
| Lucía Pariente || Alba Carrillo's mother || "My family does not know that I ripped them off" (undisc.)
|-
| bgcolor="dc143c" |13
| Emmy Russ || Reality TV star || "I lived in a juvenile center because my mother abandoned me" (undisc.)
|-
| bgcolor="dc143c" |14
| Fiama Rodríguez || LIDLT 1 participant || "I steal my lovers' underwear" (undisc.)
|-
| bgcolor="ff8c00" |15
| Sofía Cristo || DJ, Rey/Cristos daughter || "I had an affair with a married woman" (undisc.)
|-
| bgcolor="dc143c" |16
|  || Comedian || "I'm my father's brother" (undisc.)
|-
| bgcolor="dc143c" |17
| Chimo Bayo || DJ & music producer || "I made a miracle" (undisc.)
|}

 Nominations table 

 Total nominations received 

 Season 2 (2022) 

A second series''' premiered on 13 January 2022, and for the first time since Gran Hermano Revolution'', Telecinco will do a series of the format with just civilian housemates.

Housemates and secrets

Nominations table

Notes 
 : Classical nominations
 : On the first launch show the audience could choose to nominate a contestant (except Alvaro). They chose Carmen.
 : Alvaro entered on day 4 with an egg representing immunity. If he could keep it until day 7, he will be immune on week 1. Laila & Nissy were able to stole it on day 5 and they were immune on week 1.
 : On week 3 they had to make pairs for the nominations. Kenny ended up alone, not having the chance to nominate but had the power of saving one nominee and change it for another contestant. He did not use this power.
 : In pairs, they had to decide a shape: circle (usual nominations), triangle (they could split 6 points the way they wanted) or square (ineligible to nominate). 
 : For the first time the nominations were made in such a way that one contestant chose another to be saved. The last 4 contestants would make up the list of nominees. Laila and Nissy won the egg so they started. 
 : The egg also brought with it the power of direct nomination, Alberto being the chosen one.
 : Since Week 5, Laila and Nissy were separated from each other. 
 : Brenda and Nissy were nominated by the organisation after a week of high argues. 
 : For this nomination game, they had to make pairs, and one member would be saved and the other nominated, and if not, both of them nominated. 
 : For this nomination game, they had to make pairs, one teammate would nominate and the other, a member of his family would nominate instead of him. 
 : Contestants nominated with 1 and 2 points. 
 : After Sara's eviction, Adrián, Carlos, Cora, Marta and Rafa lasted as finalists. The 5th Finalist was proclaimed on Day 74. 
 : After Cora was proclaimed 5th Finalist, Adrián, Carlos, Marta and Rafa remained as finalists.
 : After Carlos was proclaimed 4th Finalist, Adrián, Marta and Rafa remained as finalists.
 : After Adrián was proclaimed 3rd Finalist, Marta and Rafa remained as finalists.

Total nominations received

Blind results

References

External links 
 Official site 

Spanish reality television series
2021 Spanish television series debuts